Pachyptera is a genus of flowering plants belonging to the family Bignoniaceae.

Its native range is Central and Southern Tropical America to Trinidad.

Species:

Pachyptera aromatica 
Pachyptera erythraea 
Pachyptera incarnata 
Pachyptera kerere 
Pachyptera linearis

References

Bignoniaceae
Bignoniaceae genera